The 44th Guldbagge Awards ceremony, presented by the Swedish Film Institute, honored the best Swedish films of 2008, and took place on 12 January 2009. Everlasting Moments directed by Jan Troell was presented with the award for Best Film.

Winner and nominees

Awards

See also
 81st Academy Awards
 66th Golden Globe Awards
 62nd British Academy Film Awards
 15th Screen Actors Guild Awards
 14th Critics' Choice Awards
 29th Golden Raspberry Awards

References

External links
Official website
Guldbaggen on Facebook
Guldbaggen on Twitter

2009 in Sweden
2008 film awards
Guldbagge Awards ceremonies
2000s in Stockholm
January 2009 events in Europe